The 1979 European Parliament election, was the first European election to be held in the United Kingdom after the European Communities (EC) decided to directly elect representatives to the European Parliament.  It was held on 7 June. Elections were also held in eight other EC states. European elections were incorporated into UK law by the European Assembly Elections Act 1978. Out of the 410 members of the European Parliament, 81 were elected from the UK. The electoral system was First Past the Post in England, Scotland and Wales (electing 78 MEPs in total) and Single Transferable Vote in Northern Ireland (electing 3 MEPs).

The result was a landslide victory for the Conservative Party, which won 60 of the 78 seats available in England, Wales and Scotland. Their decisive victory in the general election of the previous month and divisions within the Labour party on whether to stay in the EC probably helped the Conservatives to such a comprehensive victory. There was a very low turnout in the election compared with other states, the lowest in Europe. Voter apathy was an explanation, but it is likely the large number of elections in 1979 had a significant negative effect on turnout. There were referendums in Scotland and Wales on devolution in March and the general election in May, as well as local elections in England (not including London) and Wales.

Result (UK-wide)

Source: UK Parliament Briefing

Overall (England, Scotland, Wales and Northern Ireland) turnout: 32.4%
Overall votes cast: 13,460,091

Results Breakdown

England, Scotland and Wales

Source: UK Parliament Briefing

Total votes cast – 12,873,852.

Northern Ireland

Source Northern Ireland Social and Political Archive

Total votes cast – 572,239.

Constituency results

See also
Elections in the United Kingdom#European Parliament elections
List of members of the European Parliament for the United Kingdom (1979–1984)

References

European Parliament elections in the United Kingdom
European Parliament election
United Kingdom